Chromosome transmission fidelity protein 18 homolog is a protein that in humans is encoded by the CHTF18 gene.

Interactions 

CHTF18 has been shown to interact with:
 DCC1, 
 PCNA, 
 RFC2, 
 RFC3, 
 RFC4, and
 RFC5.

References

External links

Further reading